MSME & Startups Forum – Bharat is an Indian nonprofit organization founded to facilitate entrepreneurs and businesses to head the Prime Minister of India Narendra Modi's call for AtmaNirbharBharat and #VocalForLocal campaign. It has a vision to provide a platform for pan-India based MSMEs (Micro, Small & Medium Enterprises) Startups, Entrepreneurs, businesses and professionals to connect and network.

It is an Indian NGO that provides a platform for Indian MSMEs & startups. It is all about providing the much-needed platform to connect, network and explore new business opportunities to grow, to share knowledge about opportunities/options for technology up-gradation, skill development etc, by organizing seminars, conferences, expos and fairs to achieve its mission.

The founder and national president of MSME & Startup Forum -Bharat, Mr. Manoj Kumar Shah called on the union minister of Road Transport & Highways and the Minister of Micro, Small and Medium Enterprises (MSME), Mr. Nitin Gadkari on 1 March 2021.

Events 
Forum organised online webinar on 9 June 2021 with Om Prakash Sakhlecha Ji- Hob. Minister – MSME & IT, Government of Madhya Pradesh Madhya Pradesh
Forum organised online webinar on 27 March 2021 with union minister of Road Transport & Highways and the Minister of Micro, Small and Medium Enterprises (MSME), Sri. Nitin Gadkari

References 

Non-profit organisations based in India